Elymus sierrae ( Elymus sierrus) is a species of wild rye known by the common name Sierra wild rye. It is endemic to the High Sierra Nevada in California and far western Nevada, where it grows in coniferous forest and other mountain habitat generally above  in elevation.

It is a perennial grass with stems growing 30 to 50 centimeters long and decumbent along the ground at maturity. The inflorescence is a series of single-spikelet nodes a few centimeters long, each spikelet with an outward-curved awn up to 2.5 centimeters long.

References

External links
Jepson Manual Treatment
Photo gallery

sierrae
Native grasses of California
Endemic flora of California
Flora of the Sierra Nevada (United States)
Flora of Nevada